The University Courts Historic District is a historic district and neighborhood in Bloomington, Indiana, United States.

Greek houses
The Sigma Chi house at 601 E. Seventh Street, built in Free Classic style, was enlarged in 1925 by Granger, Lowe & Bollenbacher in a manner sympathetic to the original design.

The northeast corner of Indiana Avenue and Eighth Street was originally the site of a Tudor Revival house built by Maude Showers.  Situated on three lots and designed by Carlisle Bollenbacher, the house was sold to Delta Tau Delta and used for a fraternity until destroyed by fire in February 1935.  The fraternity rebuilt on the same site.  The new house was designed by Burns & James and retained the same placement on the three lots as the original house.  The general contractor was Charles A. Pike.

Delta Zeta at 809 East Seventh Street was designed by John Nichols in 1923 in the Classical Revival Style.  The general contractor was Charles F. Johnson.

Demolished houses
Before the district was first nominated for the National Register, four houses on the east half of the block bounded by Indiana Avenue, Fess Avenue, Eighth Street and Ninth Street were demolished.  Joseph Smith of the Showers Brothers furniture factory engaged John Nichols to build a two-story brick Colonial Revival house at 403 North Fess in 1914.  J. Neill was the general contractor. Clarence Neill,  general contractor, built a house for Charles F. Johnson at 421 North Fess in 1916.  Edwin C. Doeppers and Company were the architects. Indiana University's Mathers Museum of World Cultures and the Glenn A. Black Laboratory of Archaeology now occupy those two lots, among others.

Table of contributing properties
Appearing in the table below are the buildings included within the boundaries of the city-designated historic district.

References

Houses on the National Register of Historic Places in Indiana
Colonial Revival architecture in Indiana
Neoclassical architecture in Indiana
Houses in Monroe County, Indiana
Buildings and structures in Bloomington, Indiana
Historic districts on the National Register of Historic Places in Indiana
Historic districts in Monroe County, Indiana
National Register of Historic Places in Monroe County, Indiana